Sofiane Bouterbiat (born December 5, 1983 in Oran) is an Algerian football player. He is currently playing for MC El Eulma in the Algerian Ligue Professionnelle 1.

Club career
Sofiane Bouterbiat signed with MC Oran in the summer of 2011, joining them on a free transfer from USM Annaba.

References

External links
 

1983 births
Living people
Footballers from Oran
Algerian footballers
Algerian Ligue Professionnelle 1 players
MC Oran players
RCG Oran players
SCM Oran players
USM Annaba players
MC El Eulma players
Association football midfielders
21st-century Algerian people